Radford may refer to:

Places

England
Radford, Coventry, West Midlands
Radford, Nottingham, Nottinghamshire
Radford, Plymstock, Devon
Radford, Oxfordshire
Radford, Somerset
Radford, Worcestershire
Radford Cave in Devon
Radford Semele, Warwickshire

United States
Radford, Alabama
Radford, Illinois
Radford, Virginia

Elsewhere
Radford Island, an island in the Antarctic Ocean

People
Radford (surname)
Radford family, a British reality TV family with many children
Radford Davis, an author of ninjutsu works
Radford Gamack (1897–1979) Australian politician
Radford M. Neal (born 1956) Canadian computer scientist

Facilities and structures
Radford railway station, a former train station in Nottingham, England, UK
Radford railway station, Queensland, Australia
Radford Army Ammunition Plant, Radford, Virginia, USA
Radford College, Canberra, Australia; a coeducational day school
Radford University, Radford, Virginia, USA
Radford Baseball Stadium
Radford University College, Accra, Ghana
Radford High School (disambiguation), any of several public secondary schools

Other uses
Harold Radford, London coachbuilding firm
Radford (band), an American rock band
Radford Electronics, an English company making valve amplifiers
USS Radford, any of several United States Navy warships with the name

See also

 Redford (disambiguation)
 Reford (disambiguation)